Aleksandr Kokko (born 4 June 1987) is a Russian-born Finnish footballer who plays as a striker for Finnish Veikkausliiga club RoPS. 

He is of Ingrian Finn descent and emigrated with his family to Pori, Finland at the age of ten.

Club career
Born in Leningrad, Soviet Union, Kokko made his first appearance in the Finnish top flight at the age of 17 with FC Jazz. He joined FC Honka before the 2007 season and made six appearances for the club during his first season. On 5 May 2008, he scored a hat-trick when FC Honka beat FC Haka in a league match by the scoreline of 7–0. Those were his first goals in the Finnish Premier Division. Kokko was the top goalscorer in the 2008 season of Veikkausliiga with 13 goals. In August 2010, Kokko was loaned to FC PoPa. He joined VPS for the 2011 season, before joining RoPS in 2012.

On 6 August 2016, Kokko signed a two-year deal with Australian A-League club Newcastle Jets

On 10 July 2017, he decided to join Hong Kong Premier League club Eastern.

On 21 June 2018, Kokko returned to RoPS, signing until the end of the 2019 season.

International career
Kokko made his debut for the Finland U21 on 20 August 2008 in a match against Sweden. In February 2016 he debuted for the Finland national team against Sweden.

Honours

Club
FC Honka
Veikkausliiga 
Runners-up: 2008, 2009

VPS
Veikkausliiga 
Runners-up: 2015

Individual
Veikkausliiga Player of the Year: 2015
Veikkausliiga Top goalscorer: 2008, 2015
Ykkönen Top goalscorer: 2012

References

External links
Profile at RoPS 
Profile at FC PoPa 

Finnish footballers
Finland under-21 international footballers
FC Jazz players
FC Hämeenlinna players
FC Honka players
Vaasan Palloseura players
Rovaniemen Palloseura players
Newcastle Jets FC players
Veikkausliiga players
Association football forwards
Russian-speaking Finns
1987 births
Living people
People of Ingrian Finnish descent
Finland international footballers